Sharon-Lee Lane is an Australian country music singer. Her music career took off after her battle with cancer was featured on the channel nine TV series RPA, a battle that was revisited on RPA: Where Are They Now?. She won the 2007 Deadly award for most promising new talent.

Discography
Left It All Behind ep (2006)
Second Chance (2008)

References

External links
SHARON LEE LANE Biography, link to Sharon-Lee's website
Tamworth Rage Page, contains articles about Sharon-Lee

Indigenous Australian musicians
Australian women singers
Year of birth missing (living people)
Living people